Bell Busk is a hamlet situated in the Craven district of North Yorkshire, England. The hamlet is located at the southern end of Malhamdale where the nascent River Aire meets Otterburn Beck.

Historical industries in the hamlet consisted of a cotton mill that became a silk mill, with quarrying prevalent also. Tourism became the leading industry in the 20th century.

History
The name of Bell Busk is believed to have been derived from Old Norse and Old English meaning the bell shaped bush. The hamlet sits at the southern end of Malhamdale, where the River Aire meets Otterburn Beck. Malhamdale is the very northern end of Airedale. Official records of the area make no mention of the hamlet until 1585, even then, it was not shown on mapping until the early 17th century. One of the oldest houses is a Yorkshire laithe known as Granny House Farm, nowadays known as Granny House on the old Roman Road; Mark House Lane. Granny House is mentioned in the walking book 'Through Airedale from Goole to Malham' by Johnnie Gray. In 1891 it is described as a 300 year old 'Public' and a stout edifice.

There are two grade 2 listed bridges in Bell Busk: Red Bridge over Otterburn Beck and Bell Busk Bridge over The River Aire.

In 1781, a weir and large mill pond with a long mill race were constructed on the Aire to provide water power for a silk mill. The mill has long since been demolished after it was destroyed by fire, but the weir was only removed in 2018 to make fish passage easier into the spawning grounds. This is to encourage salmon into the River Aire and its tributaries after a 200-year absence.

In the 19th century, quarrying became an important industry when at least three rock quarries were in operation; Field Rock Quarry to the west, Esh Bottom Quarry to the south west and Haw Crag Quarry to the east. Haw Crag was noted for its medium-purity limestone which was used in the local buildings. Quarrying here was on quite a large scale compared to other quarries in the area;  was processed in the month of January 1877 alone. Haw Crag Quarry is now an SSSI as it "key site in the understanding of carbonate environments in the Craven Basin."

Bell Busk used to be in the West Riding of Yorkshire, but since the county boundary changes of 1974, it is now in North Yorkshire.

Metcalfe Models and Toys, a model kit firm that specialises in cardboard buildings used for dioramas and by model railway hobbyists, is based in Bell Busk.

Bell Busk is located in the civil parish of Coniston Cold and is included in the statistics there for the 2011 census.

Harrison Clock
There is a clock in St. Peters church made by James Harrison in 1845.

Transport
Originally, Bell Busk was on the packhorse route between Skipton and Settle, which meant the road veered off at Coniston Cold, whereas this now goes directly west towards Hellifield as the A65 road. The junction and road leading up to Bell Busk from Coniston Cold is narrow and can cause access problems.

As it was the nearest station to Malham Cove and Malhamdale, it took on a far greater importance than other settlements in the dale due to it being a disembarkation point for travellers. The station site was used as a backdrop to the Bette Davis film Another Man's Poison in 1951, but was closed to passengers in 1959.

The long distance paths, The Airedale Way, the Trans-Dale Trail 2 and the Rail to Trail Walk (the Bentham Line) pass through the hamlet on their way north (to the source of the River Aire for the Airedale Way and Greta Bridge for the Trans-Dale Trail), and westwards respectively. Both the Pennine Way and the Wild Yorkshire Way, pass to the east of the Hamlet, with many cottages and other overnight accommodation being offered in Bell Busk.

Notable people
William Cecil Slingsby - noted mountaineer, was born in the village

References

Sources

External links
Friends of the Dale's community archive page on Bell Busk

Hamlets in North Yorkshire
Craven District